Marinicella litoralis is a Gram-negative, aerobic, stenohaline, rod-shaped and non-motile bacterium from the genus of Marinicella which has been isolated from seawater from the Sea of Japan in Russia.

References

Alteromonadales
Bacteria described in 2010